Pseudocistela is a genus of darkling beetles in the family Tenebrionidae. There are about 18 described species in Pseudocistela, one of which is extinct.

Species
These 18 species belong to the genus Pseudocistela:

 Pseudocistela brevis (Say)
 Pseudocistela ceramboides (Linnaeus, 1758)
 Pseudocistela crassicornis (Sharp, 1885)
 Pseudocistela kauaiensis (Perkins, 1900)
 Pseudocistela konae (Perkins, 1900)
 Pseudocistela laevis (Kuster, 1850)
 Pseudocistela marginata (Ziegler)
 Pseudocistela mauiae Zimmerman, 1940
 Pseudocistela nigricollis (Perkins, 1900)
 Pseudocistela opaca (LeConte, 1859)
 Pseudocistela pacifica
 Pseudocistela pectinata Hopping, 1933
 Pseudocistela pinguis (LeConte, 1859)
 Pseudocistela sericea (Drapiez, 1828)
 Pseudocistela subaenescens (Perkins, 1900)
 Pseudocistela subsulcata (Fairmaire, 1861)
 Pseudocistela varians (Fabricius, 1787)
 † Pseudocistela gracilis Förster, 1891

References

Further reading

External links

 

Tenebrionoidea